Chem is a peer-reviewed scientific journal by Cell Press. It is a sister journal to Cell. It was established in 2016, and is currently edited by Robert Eagling.

Abstracting and indexing 
Chem is abstracted and indexed the following bibliographic databases:
INSPEC
Science Citation Index Expanded
Scopus

According to the Journal Citation Reports, the journal has a 2021 impact factor of 25.832.

References

External links 
 

English-language journals
Cell Press academic journals
Chemistry journals
Monthly journals
Publications established in 2016
Delayed open access journals